Central Bethlehem Historic District is a national historic district located in Bethlehem in Lehigh and Northampton counties in the Lehigh Valley metropolitan area of eastern Pennsylvania.

The district includes 165 contributing buildings, six contributing sites (including Nisky Hill Cemetery), nine contributing structures, and four contributing objects.  It is primarily residential, but also includes commercial buildings along Main Street.  Most of the buildings were built between the mid-18th to early-20th century. The buildings are primarily 2 1/2 stories tall and constructed of brick or stone.  More recent residences are frame construction.  The district encompasses buildings that reflect Bethlehem's development from a Moravian community, 1741-1844, to an industrial based economy, 1845-1938.  Notable non-residential buildings include several communal Moravian buildings, the George H. Myers Building, and the Hill to Hill Bridge.  Located in the district is the separately listed Lehigh Canal.

Central Bethlehem's Historic Distric was added to the National Register of Historic Places in 1972, and a boundary increase to this designation was added in 1988.

References

Bethlehem, Pennsylvania
Historic districts in Northampton County, Pennsylvania
Historic districts in Lehigh County, Pennsylvania
Historic districts on the National Register of Historic Places in Pennsylvania
National Register of Historic Places in Lehigh County, Pennsylvania